01/June/2020

Jawahar Navodaya Vidyalaya, North Tripura or locally known as JNV Kherengjuri is a boarding, co-educational  school in North Tripura district of Tripura state in India. Navodaya Vidyalayas are funded by the Indian Ministry of Human Resources Development and administered  by Navodaya Vidyalaya Smiti, an autonomous body under the ministry.

History 
The school was established in 2007, and is a part of Jawahar Navodaya Vidyalaya schools. The school was  shifted to the permanent campus in 2014. This school is administered and monitored by Shillong regional office of Navodaya Vidyalaya Smiti.

Admission 
Admission to JNV North Tripura at class VI level is made through selection test conducted by Navodaya Vidyalaya Smiti. The information about test is disseminated and advertised in district by the office of North Tripura district magistrate (Collector), who is also chairperson of Vidyalya Management Committee. 

Admission period is basically from June to August in every year.
For smooth functioning of the school, students have been allotted different houses under the care of House Masters/ Mistresses and Associates House Masters/ Mistresses.

Affiliations 
JNV North Tripura is affiliated to Central Board of Secondary Education with affiliation number 2040004.

See also 
 List of JNV schools
 Jawahar Navodaya Vidyalaya, Khowai
 Jawahar Navodaya Vidyalaya, Gomati

References

External links 

 Official Website of JNV Gomati

High schools and secondary schools in Tripura
North Tripura
Educational institutions established in 2007
2007 establishments in Tripura
North Tripura district